JP Hasson (born January 18, 1977 in Seattle, Washington, United States) is a musician, comedian and artist, best known for his musical/comedy acts JP Incorporated and Pleaseeasaur. Hasson also produces comedy, music and television related tours. Hasson lives in Los Angeles.

Biography

Music career
Born John-Peter Hasson, Hasson grew up in Indianola, Washington. In the early 1990s, at the age of 15, Hasson began creating and composing improvised comedy songs in his parents' garage.
In 2009, after 12 years of international touring and 7 official releases under the name Pleaseeasaur and many collaborations with the likes of The Dead Milkmen, Soundgarden and many more, Hasson began touring and recording under the name JP Incorporated.  In the same year he released his second album for Comedy Central, titled "An Album of Distinction”.
Hasson worked closely with co-producer Rob Crow of the band Pinback to record the collection of 24 fake TV theme songs. 
Known primarily as a live act, Hasson has toured internationally in support of Devo, Neil Hamburger and many other alternative entertainment luminaries.
In 2012, JP launched his own Los Angeles based tour consulting firm specializing in the creation and production of international touring shows and exhibits. He currently produces and manages tours for Tim & Eric, Bob’s Burgers, Pinback, Eric Andre and others.

JP Hasson is currently touring worldwide as JP Incorporated, Creative Director of his firm and is writing two books about the artwork of Major League Baseball.

Discography
Touch Me Zoo - Lawn King Wonderwear Music (1995)
Touch Me Zoo - "Untitled EP" Wonderwear Music (1996)
Touch Me Zoo - "Blow Up Your Stereo" Wonderwear Music (1996)
Jiffy Squid - self-titled album (1996)
Touch Me Zoo - "Ultra-Rare TMZ Vol. 3" (1997)
Pleaseeasaur - "As Seen On TV" imputor? (1999)
Pleaseeasaur - "Beef Flavored Island Adventures" Razler Records (2001)
Pleaseeasaur - "Pleaseeasaur International Airport" V8 Records (Australia) (2003)
Pleaseeasaur - "The Yellow Pages" imputor? (2003)
Pleaseeasaur - "The Amazing Adventures of Pleaseeasaur" Comedy Central (2006)
"Double Chunk Comedy Sampler" Comedy Central (2006)
American Sheriff - "The Long Arm of the Law" imputor? (2007)
Neil Hamburger/Pleaseeasaur - "Souvenir Record" (tour only 7" with cover art by Mark Mothersbaugh) Million Dollar Performances (2008)
JP Incorporated - "An Album of Distinction" Comedy Central (2009)
TWRP - "Ladyworld" appearing as narrator (2017)
TWRP - "The Perfect Product" (2018)
TWRP - "Return to Wherever" appearing as radio announcer (2019)
JP Incorporated - "Massage & Spa" (2021)

Filmography
"Cold Hearts" - Raven Pictures (1999)
"Pleaseeasaur - Action Spectacular" imputor? (2005)
"Pleaseeasaur - The Amazing Adventures of Pleaseeasaur" Comedy Central (2006)
Neil Hamburger Western Music and Variety" Drag City (2009)

TV shows
 Late Night with Jimmy Fallon (NBC)
 Tom Green Live Tom Green's House Tonight Red Eye with Greg Gutfeld'' (Fox News)
 "The Xtacles" (Cartoon Network/Adult Swim)
 "Poolside Chats with Neil Hamburger" (as Pleaseeasaur)

References

External links

 JP Incorporated Official Website
 Pleaseeasaur Official Website
 JP Incorporated on Comedy Central
 JP Incorporated on Atom.com
 JP Incorporated and Pleaseeasaur reviews by Mark Prindle
 J.P. Inc. hits Middle East with hilarious TV-inspired tunes
 J.P. Hasson prepares multimedia main event to headline two-night Norman Halloween show
http://www.seattleweekly.com/2008-03-12/music/pleaseeasaur-celebrate-success-by-leaving-seattle
https://web.archive.org/web/20100116192410/http://weeklydig.com/arts-entertainment/defend-yourself/200709/jp-hasson-pleaseeasaur
http://www.dustedmagazine.com/reviews/5318

1977 births
American male comedians
21st-century American comedians
American comedy musicians
Living people